ITV News at 5:30 was an early morning news bulletin on the British television network ITV, which was broadcast from 15 February 1988 until 21 December 2012. It was produced by ITN.

The 30-minute programme covered British national and international news stories, a brief business update, a look at the morning's newspapers and regular NBC News segments and broadcasts at 5:30 am every day. In the event of a major news story, they occasionally went live to the scene or crossed to the newsroom.

History
The programme began as the ITN Morning News on 15 February 1988 with the advent of 24-hour television on ITV; preceding it throughout the night would be 90-second mini-bulletins, fronted by the same anchor as the Morning News. It originally ran for an hour from 5:00am and was the first pre-subscription television outlet in Britain to broadcast regular segments from CNN. The first thirty minutes included a broadcast of the ITN World News, a bulletin intended for the international audience and composed solely of major world stories, and the second thirty minutes focused on national news stories. The practice of including the ITN World News as part of an "hour-long" ITN Morning News ended by 4 March 1991, and the time slot was amended accordingly to 5:30am.

Some EPGs and TV listings referred to the programme as the ITV Early Morning News. On 2 November 2009 the ITV Morning News was renamed as simply ITV News to coincide with the re-branding of ITV News output.

On 27 November 2012, it was announced that ITV is to axe the bulletin in favour of delivering content online for itv.com and extra resources to be put into creating a new foreign affairs unit. The programme last aired on 21 December 2012.

Newscasters (1988–2012)

Ian Axton 
Zeinab Badawi 
Faye Barker 
Richard Bath
Andrea Catherwood
Steve Clamp 
Bob Crampton 
Guy de Faye
Katie Derham 
Ali Douglas 
Steve Gaisford 
Phil Gayle
Jon Gilbert 
Alex Hyndman
Gwyn Jones
Jackie Kabler
Rachel McTavish 
Joyce Ohajah 
Nicholas Owen 
Chris Rogers
Phil Roman
Salma Siraj 
Alastair Stewart 
John Suchet
Matt Teale 
Owen Thomas 
Denis Tuohy 
Mark Webster
Charlene White 
Tim Willcox 
Sascha Williams

Reporter
Yao Chin (2008–2012)

References

External links

ITN.co.uk

1988 British television series debuts
1990s British television series
2000s British television series
2010s British television series
2012 British television series endings
ITN
ITV news shows